Muyembe is a town in the Eastern Region of Uganda.

Location
The coordinates of Muyembe are 1°18'21.0"N, 34°17'210"E (Latitude:1.305833; Longitude:34.289172).

Overview
Muyembe lies on the main road between Mbale, (2014 pop. 96,189), the largest town in Eastern Uganda and Moroto, (2014 pop. 14,818), the largest town in Karamoja sub-region. At Muyembe, the tarmacked Mbale–Muyembe Road, meets the gravel-surfaced Muyembe–Nakapiripirit Road. Arrangements are underway to improve the un-tarmacked road to class II bitumen surface with drainage channels and culverts.

See also
Gisu people
Mount Elgon
Mount Elgon National Park

References

External links
Mt. Elgon Hydro power project stalls

Bulambuli District
Populated places in Eastern Region, Uganda
Cities in the Great Rift Valley